Brocksford Hall is a country house about one mile (1.6 km) east of Doveridge village, in the south west corner of Derbyshire, England.  It is recorded in the National Heritage List for England as a designated Grade II listed building.

History

The house was built in 1893 for Charles William Jervis Smith and designed by the Chester architectural practice of Douglas and Fordham. From 1942 to 1994 it was used as an independent preparatory boarding school. The headmaster of Birkdale School, Mr John Gibson Roberts, moved Birkdale pupils evacuated to Derbyshire during the Second World War into Brocksford Hall after the war. Birkdale continued at Oakbrook under another headmaster. The hall and original outbuildings were converted into private apartments and houses. The later additional outbuildings for the school were demolished.

Architecture

The house was built in Jacobethan style and constructed in Ruabon red brick with much blue brick diapering and Hollington stone dressings.  It was the last house designed by Douglas on such a large scale.

See also

Listed buildings in Doveridge
List of houses and associated buildings by John Douglas

References

Grade II listed buildings in Derbyshire
Grade II listed houses
Houses completed in 1893
Country houses in Derbyshire
John Douglas buildings
Defunct schools in Derbyshire